Sir James Porter Corry, 1st Baronet (8 September 1826 – 28 November 1891) was an Irish politician. He served as a Conservative Member of Parliament (MP) from 1874 to 1885 and an Irish Unionist Alliance MP from 1886 until his death.

Sir James was the son of Robert Corry, of Turnagardy, Newtownards, Co. Down, a quarry owner and Belfast timber merchant.  Educated at the Royal Belfast Academic Institution, he entered the family timber firm, which was at that time occupied with building the growing industrial port of Belfast.

He was first elected to Parliament for the Irish constituency of Belfast in the 1874 general election. The constituency was abolished for the 1885 general election. On 15 September 1885 he was created a baronet, of Dunraven, Antrim.

On 1 February 1886 he became the MP for Mid Armagh in a by-election following the death of John McKane. In July 1886, he joined the Irish Unionist Alliance and stood for subsequent elections for this party. He died, in office, in 1891 at his home, Dunraven on Belfast's Malone Road, and was succeeded in the baronetcy by his son, William.

Arms

References

External links 

1826 births
1891 deaths
Baronets in the Baronetage of the United Kingdom
Irish Conservative Party MPs
Irish Unionist Party politicians
Members of the Parliament of the United Kingdom for County Armagh constituencies (1801–1922)
UK MPs 1874–1880
UK MPs 1880–1885
UK MPs 1885–1886
UK MPs 1886–1892